The Netball World Cup is a quadrennial international netball world championship organised by World Netball, inaugurated in 1963. Since its inception the competition has been dominated primarily by the Australia national netball team and the New Zealand national netball team, as of the 2019 event having both medaled in every one of the 15 championships – Trinidad and Tobago is the only other team to have won a title (a three-way tie in the 1979 championship). The most recent tournament was the 2019 Netball World Cup in Liverpool, England, which was won by New Zealand.

History

In 1960, representatives from Australia, England, New Zealand, South Africa and the West Indies met to discuss standardising the rules of the sport. This led to the establishment of the International Federation of Women's Basketball and Netball (which later became the International Federation of Netball Associations). Formal rules were established at this inaugural meeting and a decision to hold World Championship tournaments every four years was also made. The first World Netball Championship was held in 1963 and was hosted by England. The tournament was renamed to the World Cup as opposed to "Championships" in 2015. Since 1991 the tournament has maintained a format allowing semi-finals and finals matches to be played, where previously the tournament held no finals and instead utilised the round-robin system, which occasionally led to more than one nation being crowned world champions.

Australia or New Zealand have won the all of the titles, though emerging netball nations England, South Africa and Jamaica have come close to dislodging the top-tier nations on several occasions. In 1979 Australia, New Zealand and Trinidad and Tobago were all joint champions. South Africa finished runners-up in 1995 and England and Jamaica have contested several bronze medal matches and come up short in narrow semi-final defeats. The reigning world champions are New Zealand, who defeated arch-rivals Australia by one goal in the 2019 final. They will defend their title in Cape Town, South Africa in 2023.

Results

Tournament history

Performance of nations

Participating nations

See also
 International Netball Federation (INF)
 INF World Rankings
 World Netball Series
 Netball World Youth Cup

Notes

References
Netball Scoop - Team Lists (World Championships)

Bibliography

References

External links
 Official INF website
 Netball World Cup 2019 Liverpool official website

 
Recurring sporting events established in 1963
International netball competitions
Netball